Isham Edgar Jones (January 31, 1894 – October 19, 1956) was an American bandleader, saxophonist, bassist and songwriter.

Career
Jones was born in Coalton, Ohio, United States, to a musical and mining family. His father, Richard Isham Jones (1865–1945), was a violinist. The family moved to Saginaw, Michigan, where Jones grew up and started his first ensemble for church concerts. In 1911 one of Jones's earliest compositions "On the Alamo" was published by Tell Taylor Inc. (Taylor had formed a publishing company the year before when his song "Down by the Old Mill Stream" became a hit.)

In 1915 Jones moved to Chicago, Illinois. He performed at the Green Mill Gardens, then began playing at Fred Mann's Rainbo Gardens. Chicago remained his home until 1932, when he settled in New York City. He also toured England with his orchestra in 1925.

In 1917, he composed the tune "We're In The Army Now" (also known as "You're In the Army Now") when the United States entered World War I. The same tune was popular during World War II and it is played by the U.S. Army Band.

The Isham Jones band made a series of popular gramophone records for Brunswick throughout the 1920s. His first 26 sides, made at Rainbo Gardens, were credited to "Isham Jones' Rainbo Orchestra". By the end of 1920, the name was simply "Isham Jones' Orchestra".

He led one of the most popular dance bands in the 1920s and 1930s. His first successful recording, "Wabash Blues" written by Dave Ringle and Fred Meinken, was recorded in 1921. This million-seller stayed for twelve weeks in the U.S. charts, six at No. 1. It was awarded a gold disc by the RIAA. Noted musicians who played in Jones's band included Louis Panico, Benny Goodman (although no records were made during the short time he was there), Woody Herman, Walt Yoder, and Roy Bargy. Reed virtuoso Al Gallodoro appeared briefly with Jones in 1933, taking part in a record date October 3.

From the start, his Brunswick records were popular. There was a gap from October 1927 to June 1929 where Jones did not record due to disbanding and reorganization.

From 1929 to 1932, his Brunswick recordings became even more sophisticated with offbeat arrangements by Gordon Jenkins and others; Jones was his own arranger early on, but cultivated others. During this period, Jones started featuring violinist Eddie Stone as one of his regular vocalists. Stone had an unusual, almost humorous tone to his voice. His other vocalists included Frank Sylvano, Billy Scott, and Arthur Jarrett. In 1932, he added Joe Martin, another of the band's violinists, as a frequent vocalist. In April that year, young Bing Crosby recorded two sessions with Jones's group which included "Sweet Georgia Brown". Crosby at this point in his career was still singing in a jazz idiom, transitioning to his better known "crooner" style. 

In August 1932, Jones signed with Victor, and these records are considered among the best arranged and performed commercial dance band records of the Depression era. Victor's recording technique was suited to Jones' band. In October 1932, he teamed up with the Three X Sisters in New York who had just departed from CBS radio. They recorded "experimental" songs for RCA Victor in which Jones began to fuse jazz and early swing music. They recorded "Where? (I Wonder Where?)" and "What Would Happen to Me If Something Happened to You." His Victor releases had an almost symphonic sound, often with a strong use of tuba. During his Victor period, he recorded two long playing "Program Transcription" records as part of Victor's unsuccessful 33 1/3 RPM series. He stayed with Victor until July 1934, when he signed with Decca. Jones's recordings during this period rivaled Paul Whiteman, Waring's Pennsylvanians, Leo Reisman and other dance orchestras as examples of the most popular dance music of the era.

Jones' Decca recordings are often unfavorably compared to his Victor recordings, due to Decca's recording techniques, Decca's insisting that Jones re-record many of his Victor recordings, and the apparent smaller size of his orchestra. After he left Decca in 1936, he again retired and his orchestra was taken over by band member Woody Herman. Jones started a new band in 1937–38 and recorded a handful of sessions under the ARC labels: Melotone, Perfect and Banner. 

In the 1940s, Jones resided on his poultry farm in Colorado, which he occasionally left for short tours with pickup bands. He later resided in Los Angeles. He moved to Hollywood, Florida in 1955, and died there of cancer in 1956. (He is interred at Forest Lawn Memorial Park in Glendale, California, and perhaps for that reason is often erroneously listed as having died in Hollywood, California.)  

His great-nephew was the now-deceased jazz drummer Rusty Jones.

Compositions 
Isham Jones was the leader of one of America's most popular dance bands in the first half of the 20th century, between the two World Wars. His remarkable string of chart-topping compositions between 1922 and 1925, in collaboration with lyricist Gus Kahn, and later with Charles Newman, included eight number 1 records, an unequaled body of work for a full-time band leader. Each of the following selections peaked in the top ten, according to Joel Whitburn's Pop Memories 1890-1954.

The following songs were composed by Jones:

 "Broken Hearted Melody" 1922; lyrics, Gus Kahn
 "Feeling That Way" 1930
 "I Can't Believe It's True" 1932; lyrics, Charles Newman & Ben Bernie
 "I'll Never Have to Dream Again" 1932; lyrics, Charles Newman
 "I'll See You in My Dreams"; lyrics, Gus Kahn; #1 for seven weeks, Number 2 single for year 1925
 "I'm  Tired of Everything but You" 1925
 "It Had to Be You"; lyrics, Gus Kahn; #1 for five weeks, Number 4 single for year 1924
 "My Castle In Spain" 1926
 "Never Again" 1924"; lyrics, Gus Kahn
 "On the Alamo" ; lyrics, Gus Kahn;  #1 for four weeks, Number 7 single for year 1922 
 "The One I Love (Belongs to Somebody Else)" 1924; lyrics, Gus Kahn
 "Some Other Day, Some Other Girl"; lyrics, Gus Kahn; published  by Milton Weil Music Co., Chicago.
 "Spain" 1930; lyrics, Gus Kahn; #1 for two weeks, 1924
 "Swingin' Down the Lane"; lyrics, Gus Kahn – #1 six weeks, Number 2 single for year 1923
 Al Jolson w Isham Jones Orchestra - "The One I Love (Belongs to Somebody Else)" 1924
 "There Is No Greater Love" 1936; lyrics, Marty Symes
 "What's the Use?" 1930; lyrics, Charles Newman
 "Why Can't This Night Go On Forever?" (another theme song) 1932; lyrics, Charles Newman
 "We're In The Army Now"   lyrics by Tell Taylor & Ole Olsen
 "You're Just a Dream Come True" (his theme song) 1931; lyrics, Charles Newman
 "You've Got Me Crying Again" 1933; lyrics, Charles Newman

Other Chart-topping recordings
This group were hits, but written by other composers:

 "Kismet" Isham Jones Rainbo Orchestra  Composer Herschel Henlere
 "Make Believe" Isham Jones Orchestra 1920 w. Benny Davis m. Jack Shilkret
 "Wabash Blues" Composer Fred Meinken - #1 for six weeks, Number 2 single for year 1921
 "My Honey's Lovin' Arms" 1922 Herman  Ruby-Joseph Meyer
 "The World Is Waiting for the Sunrise" 1922 - composed by Raymond Roberts (psued. of Ernest Seitz) and lyrics by Gene Lockhart
 "Who's Sorry Now?" 1923 - composed by Ted Snyder, lyrics by Bert Kalmar and Harry Ruby.
 "Someone Else Walked Right In" 1923 Irving  Berlin
 Al Jolson w Isham Jones Orchestra - "Steppin' Out" John S. Howard, Con Conrad
 Al Jolson w Isham Jones Orchestra - "California Here I Come" Al Jolson, Bud DeSylva, Joseph Meyer #1 for six weeks, Number 2 single for year 1924
 "Nobody's Sweetheart"  ©Jack Mills, Inc., New York. Music, Billy Meyers & Elmer Schoebel, lyrics, Gus Kahn & Ernie Erdman
 Al Jolson w Isham Jones Orchestra - "I'm Goin' South" Abner Silver, Harry M. Woods
 "My Best Girl" 1925 Walter Donaldson
 "Riverboat Shuffle 1925 Dick Voynow-Hoagy Carmichael-Irving Mills
 "Sweet Georgia Brown" 1925 Ben Bernie-Maceo Pinkard-Kenneth Casey
 "Remember" Irving Berlin  #1 one week, 1925
 "Original Charleston" (1925) Cecil Mack-James P. Johnson
 "At Peace with the World" 1926 Irving Berlin
 "It Made You Happy When You Made Me Cry" 1926 Walter Donaldson
 "I Lost  My Heart In Monterey (When I Found You)" 1926 Raymond Egan-Buddy Rose-Richard Whiting
 "Together We Two" Isham Jones Orchestra with the Keller Sisters 1928 Irving Berlin
 "Stardust" (1930) Hoagy Carmichael - one of the bestselling versions. Jones commissioned Victor Young to write a ballad instrumental of the mid-tempo tune and it was this arrangement (with Victor Young's violin solo) which became such a hit. Mitchell Parish wrote lyrics for the song at this time.
 "Lonesome Lover" 1931 Alfred Bryan, James V. Monaco
 "Snuggled on Your Shoulder (Cuddled in Your Arms)" 1932 Joe Young, Carmen Lombardo
 "My Silent Love" 1932 Edward Heyman and Dana Suesse
 "Everyone Says I Love You" 1932 Harry Ruby, Bert Kalmar
 "A Little Street Where Old Friends Meet" 1932 Gus Kahn, Harry Woods
 "It Isn't Fair" 1933 Richard Himber, Frank Warshauer, Sylvester Sprigato
 "Shadows on the Swanee" 1933 Johnny Burke, Harold Spina, Joe Young
 "Over Somebody Else's Shoulder" 1934 Al Sherman, Al Lewis
 "Neighbors" 1934 Charles O'Flynn, James Cavanaugh, Frank Weldon
 "For All We Know" 1934 Sam M. Lewis, J. Fred Coots

Discography
 Happy: The 1920 Rainbo Orchestra Sides (Archeophone, 2014)
 Song of the Blues (1923-1932) (Rivermont Records, 2008)
Shadows on the Swanee (1932-1934) (Rivermont Records, 2013)

Honors
 1989 – Big Band and Jazz Hall of Fame, Songwriters Hall of Fame
 2007 – "It Had to Be You" inducted into the Grammy Hall of Fame

References

Bibliography
 The Complete Encyclopedia of Popular Music and Jazz 1900–1950. Roger D. Kinkle: Arlington House Publishers, 1974,

External links

Isham Jones recordings at the Discography of American Historical Recordings.

Isham Jones and his Orchestra Red Hot Jazz Archive
Shellac.org 
Archeophone Records

1894 births
1956 deaths
American bandleaders
Big band bandleaders
American male violinists
American male saxophonists
Songwriters from Ohio
Musicians from Saginaw, Michigan
People from Jackson County, Ohio
Vocalion Records artists
Brunswick Records artists
Victor Records artists
Decca Records artists
20th-century American conductors (music)
20th-century American violinists
20th-century American saxophonists
Songwriters from Michigan
Burials at Forest Lawn Memorial Park (Glendale)
20th-century American male musicians
American male songwriters